The 2006–07 season was the 104th season in Bradford City A.F.C.'s history, their 92nd in The Football League and 94th in the league system of English football.

League table

Match results

Legend

Player details

See also
2006–07 in English football
The Football League 2006–07

References

Bradford City A.F.C. seasons
Bradford City